Brahmanand S. Siingh (born 3 May 1965) is a filmmaker and author from Mumbai, India. He is best known for the films Kaagaz Ki Kashti, a biopic on Jagjit Singh and his feature-length documentary on R. D. Burman, Pancham Unmixed: Mujhe Chalte Jaana Hai.

Early life and education

Brahmanand S Siingh grew up in Purnia, Bihar. Later he moved to St Xavier's College Ranchi and eventually to Kolkata University for his English Literature Masters. His journeys into cinema, however, started within a year of his moving to Mumbai in 1993.

Career 
Brahmanand began writing about art and cinema in the 1980s, publishing articles in publications like The Telegraph, Statesman, Times of India, The Hindu, Indian Express, and The Independent. He also published online work during the dotcom boom. Brahmanand has published over 3,000 articles and features, essays, poems and short stories, as well as three biographical books, Strings Of Eternity, Diamonds & Rust and Lightness Of Being.

He began making films in the late 1990s, mainly producing biographical documentaries and independent films. He is most well known for his experiential biopics on figures like RD Burman and Jagjit Singh (Pancham Unmixed & Kaagaz Ki Kashti).

He has also won the REX-Karmaveer-Chakra Awards, in partnership with the United Nations, for transforming lives through social impact projects and ideas of hope. Siingh's latest feature project, Jhalki, a feature film that attempts to create public awareness of child trafficking and child labor.

He has also sat on the jury of various international film festivals and award platforms, and conducts filmmaking and scriptwriting workshops.

Filmography 

As a director and/or producer.

Awards

References

External links 

Brahmanand S Siingh on IMDb
Brahmanand S Siingh on Facebook
Brahmanand S Siingh on Twitter
Brahmanand S Siingh on Instagram

1965 births
Living people
Film directors from Bihar
Hindi-language film directors
Hindi film producers
Film producers from Bihar
Indian documentary film directors
21st-century Indian film directors
National Film Award (India) winners
Indian screenwriters